Dad's Army is a British television sitcom about the United Kingdom's Home Guard during the Second World War. It was written by Jimmy Perry and David Croft, and originally broadcast on BBC1 from 31 July 1968 to 13 November 1977. It ran for nine series and 80 episodes in total; a feature film released in 1971, a stage show and a radio version based on the television scripts were also produced. The series regularly gained audiences of 18 million viewers and is still shown internationally.

The Home Guard consisted of local volunteers otherwise ineligible for military service, either because of age (hence the title Dad's Army), medical reasons or by being in professions exempt from conscription. Most of the platoon members in Dad's Army are over military age and the series stars several older British actors, including Arnold Ridley, John Laurie, Arthur Lowe and John Le Mesurier. Younger members of the cast included Ian Lavender, Clive Dunn (who, despite being one of the younger cast members, played the oldest guardsman, Lance Corporal Jones) and James Beck (who died suddenly during production of the sixth series in 1973). Other regular cast members included Frank Williams as the vicar and Bill Pertwee as the chief ARP warden.
 
The series has influenced British popular culture, with its catchphrases and characters being well known. The Radio Times magazine listed Captain Mainwaring's "You stupid boy!" among the 25 greatest put-downs on TV. A 2001 Channel 4 poll ranked Captain Mainwaring 21st on their list of the 100 Greatest TV Characters. In 2004, Dad's Army came fourth in a BBC poll to find Britain's Best Sitcom. It was placed 13th in a list of the 100 Greatest British Television Programmes drawn up by the British Film Institute in 2000 and voted for by industry professionals. A second feature film of Dad's Army with a different cast was released in 2016.

In 2019, UKTV recreated three missing episodes for broadcast in August that year on its Gold channel under the title Dad's Army: The Lost Episodes, starring Kevin McNally and Robert Bathurst as Captain Mainwaring and Sergeant Wilson.

Origins
Originally intended to be called The Fighting Tigers, Dad's Army was based partly on co-writer and creator Jimmy Perry's experiences in the Local Defence Volunteers (LDV, later known as the Home Guard) and highlighted a somewhat forgotten aspect of defence during the Second World War. Perry was only 17 years old when he joined the 10th Hertfordshire Battalion. His mother did not like him being out at night, and feared he might catch cold; he partly resembled the character of Private Pike. An elderly Lance Corporal in the 10th Hertfordshire often referred to fighting under Kitchener against the "Fuzzy Wuzzies" (Hadendoa), and was the model for Corporal Jones.

Other influences included the work of comedians such as Will Hay, whose film Oh, Mr Porter! featured a pompous ass, an old man and a young man; together, this gave Perry the ideas for Mainwaring, Godfrey and Pike. Film historian Jeffrey Richards has cited Lancastrian comedian Robb Wilton as a key influence; he portrayed a work-shy husband who joined the Home Guard in numerous comic sketches during WW2.

Perry wrote the first script and gave it to David Croft while working as a minor actor in the Croft-produced sitcom Hugh and I, originally intending the role of the spiv, later called Walker, to be his own. Croft was impressed and sent the script to Michael Mills, the BBC's Head of Comedy and the series was commissioned.

In his book Dad's Army, Graham McCann explains that the show owes much to Michael Mills. It was he who renamed the show Dad's Army. He did not like Brightsea-on-Sea, so the location was changed to Walmington-on-Sea. He was happy with the names for the characters Mainwaring, Godfrey and Pike, but not with other names, and he made suggestions: Private Jim Duck became Frazer, Joe Fish became Joe Walker and Jim Jones became Jack Jones. He also suggested adding a Scot. Jimmy Perry had produced the original idea but needed a more experienced partner to see it through. Mills suggested David Croft and this launched the beginning of their association.

When an episode was shown to members of the public to gauge audience reaction prior to broadcast of the first series, the majority of the audience thought it was very poor. The production team put the report containing the negative comments at the bottom of David Croft's in-tray. He only saw it several months later, after the series had been broadcast and received a positive response.

Situation
The show is set in the fictional seaside town of Walmington-on-Sea, on the south coast of England. The exterior scenes were mostly filmed in and around the Stanford Training Area [STANTA], near Thetford, Norfolk. Walmington, and its Home Guard platoon, would be on the front line in the event of a German invasion across the English Channel. The first series has a loose narrative thread, with Captain Mainwaring's platoon being formed and equipped, initially with wooden guns and LDV armbands, later on with full army uniforms; the platoon is part of the Queen's Own Royal West Kent Regiment.

The first episode, "The Man and the Hour", begins with a scene set in the "present day" of 1968, in which Mainwaring addresses his old platoon as part of the contemporary '"I'm Backing Britain" campaign. The prologue opening was a condition imposed after initial concerns from Paul Fox, the BBC1 controller, that it belittled the efforts of the Home Guard. After Mainwaring relates how he had backed Britain in 1940, the episode proper begins; Dad's Army is thus told in flashback, although the final episode does not return to 1968. Later episodes are largely self-contained, albeit referring to previous events and with additional character development.

As the comedy in many ways relies on the platoon's lack of participation in the Second World War, opposition to their activities has to come from another quarter and this is generally provided by Air Raid Precautions (ARP) Warden Hodges, and sometimes by the verger of the local church (St Aldhelm's) or by Captain Square and the neighbouring Eastgate Home Guard platoon. The group does have some encounters related to the enemy, such as downed German planes, a Luftwaffe pilot who parachutes into the town's clock tower, a U-boat crew and discarded parachutes that may have been German; a Viennese ornithologist appears in "Man Hunt" and an IRA suspect appears in "Absent Friends".

The humour ranges from the subtle (especially the class-reversed relationship between grammar school-educated Mainwaring, the local bank manager, and public school-educated Wilson, his deputy at the bank) to the slapstick (the antics of the elderly Jones being a prime example). Jones had several catchphrases, including "Don't panic!" (while panicking himself), "They don't like it up 'em", "Permission to speak, sir?" and talk about the "Fuzzy-Wuzzies". Mainwaring says "You stupid boy" to Pike in many episodes. Other cast members used catch phrases including Sergeant Wilson who regularly asked ‘Do you think that’s wise, sir?’ when Captain Mainwaring made a suggestion.

The early series occasionally include darker humour, reflecting that, especially early in the war, the Home Guard was woefully under-equipped but was still willing to resist the Wehrmacht. For instance, in the episode "The Battle of Godfrey's Cottage", the platoon believes the enemy has invaded Britain. Mainwaring, Godfrey, Frazer and Jones (along with Godfrey's sisters, who are completely unaware of the invasion) decide to stay at the cottage to delay the German advance, buying the regular army time to arrive with reinforcements; "It'll probably be the end of us, but we're ready for that, aren't we, men?", says Mainwaring. "Of course", replies Frazer.

Characters

Main characters
 Captain George Mainwaring (Arthur Lowe), the pompous, if essentially brave and unerringly patriotic local bank manager, Mainwaring appointed himself leader of his town's contingent of Local Defence Volunteers. He had been a lieutenant in the First World War, but is embarrassed by the fact that he never saw combat, being sent to France only in 1919 after the Armistice and then part of the Army of Occupation in Germany. The character, along with Wilson and Pike, also appeared in the pilot episode of the radio series It Sticks Out Half a Mile. Due to the death of Arthur Lowe, the first episode of the full series of the radio comedy was remade with the character of Hodges replacing Mainwaring. 
 Sergeant Arthur Wilson (John Le Mesurier), a diffident, upper-middle-class chief bank clerk who would quietly question Mainwaring's judgement ("Do you think that's wise, sir?"). Wilson had actually served as a captain during the First World War, but he only reveals this in the final episode. He does not live with the Pike family but is implied to be in a relationship with the widowed Mrs Pike. This hinted relationship would also be mentioned in the later radio series It Sticks Out Half a Mile, set after the end of the war.
 Lance Corporal Jack Jones (Clive Dunn), the local butcher, born in 1870. Jones was an old campaigner who enlisted as a drummer boy at the age of 14 and participated, as a boy soldier, in the Gordon Relief Expedition of 1884–85 and, as an adult, in Kitchener's campaign in the Sudan in 1896–98. Jones also served during the Boer War and the Great War. He often suffers from the effects of malaria caught during one of his campaigns, and has to be calmed during his "shudders". Often seen as fastidious and a worrier, he has a number of catchphrases, including "They don't like it up em!" and "don't panic, don't panic!", which he says when panicking. Dunn was considerably younger than his character, being only 48 at the start of filming. This meant he often performed the physical comedy of the show, which some of the older cast members were no longer capable of.
 Private James Frazer (John Laurie), a dour Scottish former Chief Petty Officer on HMS Defiant in the Royal Navy. He served at the Battle of Jutland as a ship's cook and also has a medal for having served on Shackleton's Antarctic expedition. He grew up on the Isle of Barra. In episode one, he states that he owns a philately shop, but subsequently his profession is changed to an undertaker. His catchphrase was "We're doomed. Doomed!"
 Private Joe Walker (James Beck),  a black market spiv, Walker was one of only two able-bodied men of military age among the main characters (the other one being Private Pike). In the first episode, Walker claimed he was not called up to the regular army because he was in a reserved occupation as a wholesale supplier. In one of the missing episodes, it was revealed that he was not called up because of an allergy to corned beef. Walker was written out of the series following James Beck's death in 1973.
 Private Charles Godfrey (Arnold Ridley), a retired shop assistant who had worked at the Army & Navy Store in London. He lives in Walmington with his elderly sisters and serves as the platoon's medical orderly. He has a weak bladder and often needs to "be excused". A conscientious objector during the First World War, he was nevertheless awarded the Military Medal for heroic actions as a combat medic during the Battle of the Somme. He also demonstrated bravery during his Home Guard service particularly during the "Branded" episode where Mainwaring, unconscious in a smoke-filled room, is rescued by Godfrey.
 Private Frank Pike (Ian Lavender), the youngest of the platoon, a cosseted, somewhat immature mother's boy, often wearing a thick scarf over his uniform to prevent illness and a frequent target for Mainwaring's derision ("You stupid boy!"). Pike is not called up to the regular army due to his rare blood group (in series 8 he is excused for this reason). He works for Mainwaring in his day job as an assistant bank clerk. He frequently addresses Sergeant Wilson as "Uncle Arthur". (On the last day of filming, David Croft confirmed to Lavender that Wilson was Pike's father.) Pike would later appear in the radio series It Sticks Out Half a Mile.

Supporting characters
 ARP Chief Warden William Hodges (Bill Pertwee), the platoon's major rival and nemesis. He calls Mainwaring "Napoleon".  Mainwaring looks down on him as the local greengrocer and dislikes that Hodges saw active service in the Great War. As an Air Raid Precautions (ARP) warden, he is always demanding that people "put that light out". To the home guard he often calls "You ruddy hooligans!" The character of Hodges would later appear in the radio series It Sticks Out Half a Mile, although not in the pilot episode. 
 Reverend Timothy Farthing (Frank Williams), the effete, petulant vicar of St Aldhelm's Church. He reluctantly shares his church hall and office with the platoon.
 Maurice Yeatman (Edward Sinclair), the verger at St Aldhelm's Church and Scoutmaster of the local Sea Scout troop. He is often hostile to the platoon while frequently sycophantic towards the vicar, who often struggles to tolerate him and frequently employs the catchphrase "Oh do be quiet, Mr Yeatman".
 Mrs Mavis Pike (Janet Davies), Pike's overbearing widowed mother, who is often implied to be in a relationship with Sergeant Wilson. Liz Fraser replaced Janet Davies in the 1971 film version. 
 Mrs Fox (Pamela Cundell), a glamorous widow. There is a mutual attraction with Corporal Jones and the couple marry in the last episode. Illicit little "extras" are passed across the counter on her regular visits to Jones's butchers shop and she helps the platoon with official functions. In the episode "Mum's Army", she gives her Christian name as Marcia, but by the final episode she is addressed as Mildred.
 Private Sponge (Colin Bean), a sheep farmer. He led the members of the platoon's second section (the first section being led by Corporal Jones) and thus had only occasional speaking parts, although his character became more prominent in later series. He appeared in 76 of the 80 episodes.
 Mr Claude Gordon (Eric Longworth), the Walmington town clerk often involved when the platoon are taking part in local parades and displays. Although generally civil with Captain Mainwaring and his men, he is an officious and somewhat pompous individual, and Hodges tends to use him to try and interfere with the platoon's activities. 
 Private Cheeseman (Talfryn Thomas), a Welshman who works for the town newspaper. He joined the Walmington-on-Sea platoon during the seventh series after the sudden death of James Beck, who played Private Walker.
 Captain Square (Geoffrey Lumsden), the pompous commanding officer of the rival Eastgate Platoon, and a former soldier who served with Lawrence of Arabia during the Great War. He is frequently at loggerheads with Mainwaring (whose name he persists in mispronouncing as spelt, "Main-wearing", instead of the correct "Mannering") and has the catchphrase, "You blithering idiot!"
 Mrs Yeatman (Olive Mercer), the somewhat tyrannical wife of Maurice Yeatman, the verger. Over the course of the series, her first name is given as either Beryl, Anthea or Tracey.
 Mr Sidney Bluett (Harold Bennett), an elderly local man who is occasionally involved with the antics of both the platoon and Hodges. He and Mrs Yeatman are implied to be having an affair.
 Miss Janet King (Caroline Dowdeswell), a clerk at Swallow Bank who works with Mainwaring, Wilson and Pike in the first series.
 Edith Parish (Wendy Richard) also called Shirley, a cinema usherette and girlfriend of Private Walker.
 Dolly (Amy Dalby and Joan Cooper) and Cissy Godfrey (Nan Braunton and Kathleen Saintsbury), Private Godfrey's spinster sisters, who reside with him at their cottage.
 Elizabeth Mainwaring (Unseen character), Mainwaring's reclusive, paranoid and domineering wife who is never seen on-screen. Her marriage with Mainwaring is not a happy one and Mainwaring does his best to avoid her at any opportunity. They have no children.

Other actors who appeared in small roles include Timothy Carlton, Don Estelle, Nigel Hawthorne, Geoffrey Hughes, Michael Knowles, John Ringham, Fulton Mackay, Anthony Sagar, Anthony Sharp, Carmen Silvera and Barbara Windsor.

Larry Martyn appeared as an unnamed private in four episodes, and later took over the part of Walker in the radio series following the death of James Beck. The former cricketer Fred Trueman appeared in "The Test".

Opening and closing credits
The show's opening titles were originally intended to feature footage of refugees and Nazi troops, to illustrate the threat faced by the Home Guard. Despite opposition from the BBC's Head of Comedy Michael Mills, Paul Fox, the controller of BBC 1, ordered that these be removed on the grounds that they were offensive. The replacement titles featured the animated sequence of swastika-headed arrows approaching Britain. The opening titles were updated twice; firstly in series 3, adding colour and improved animation and then again in series 6, which made some minor modifications to the animation.

There were two different versions of the closing credits for the show. The first version, used in series 1 and 2, simply showed footage of the main cast superimposed over a still photograph, with the crew credits rolling over a black background. The better known closing credits, introduced in series 3, were a homage to the end credits of the film The Way Ahead (1944) which had covered the training of a platoon during the war. In both instances, each character is shown as they walk across a smoke-filled battlefield. One of the actors in Dad's Army, John Laurie, also appeared in that film and his performance in the end credits of The Way Ahead appears to be copied in the sitcom. Coincidentally, the film's lead character (played by David Niven) is named Lieutenant Jim Perry.

Music
The show's theme tune, "Who Do You Think You Are Kidding, Mr Hitler?" was Jimmy Perry's idea, intended as a gentle pastiche of wartime songs. The other songs were authentic 1940s music recordings. Perry wrote the lyrics and composed the music with Derek Taverner. Perry persuaded one of his childhood idols, wartime entertainer Bud Flanagan, to sing the theme for 100 guineas. Flanagan died less than a year after the recording. At the time it was widely believed to be a wartime song. The music over the opening credits was recorded at Riverside Studios, Flanagan being accompanied by the Orchestra of the Band of the Coldstream Guards.

The version played over the opening credits differs slightly from the full version recorded by Flanagan; an edit removes, for timing reasons, two lines of lyric with the "middle eight" tune: "So watch out Mr Hitler, you have met your match in us/If you think you can crush us, we're afraid you've missed the bus." (The latter lyric is a reference to a speech by Neville Chamberlain.) Bud Flanagan's full version appears as an Easter egg on the first series DVD release and on the authorised soundtrack CD issued by CD41. Arthur Lowe also recorded a full version of the theme.

The closing credits feature an instrumental march version of the song played by the Band of the Coldstream Guards conducted by Captain (later Lieutenant Colonel) Trevor L. Sharpe, ending with the air-raid warning siren sounding all-clear. It is accompanied by a style of credits that became a trademark of David Croft: the caption "You have been watching", followed by vignettes of the main cast.

The series also contains genuine wartime and period songs between scenes, usually brief quotations that have some reference to the theme of the episode or the scene. Many appear on the CD soundtrack issued by CD41, being the same versions used in the series.

TV episodes

The television programme lasted nine series and was broadcast over nine years, with 80 episodes in total, including three Christmas specials and an hour-long special. At its peak, the programme regularly gained audiences of 18.5 million. There were also four short specials broadcast as part of Christmas Night with the Stars in 1968, 1969, 1970 and 1972; one of which was also restaged as part of the Royal Variety Performance 1975.

Missing episodes

The first two series were recorded and screened in black and white, while series 3 to 9 were recorded and screened in colour. Even so, one episode in series 3, Room at the Bottom, formerly only survived in black and white and remains on the official DVDs in this form. This episode has benefited from colour recovery technology, using a buried colour signal (chroma dots) in the black-and-white telerecording to restore the episode back to colour and was transmitted on 13 December 2008 on BBC Two. Dad's Army was less affected than most from the wiping of videotape, but three second-series episodes remain missing: episode 9 "The Loneliness of the Long Distance Walker", episode 11 "A Stripe for Frazer" and episode 12 "Under Fire". (All three missing episodes were among those remade for BBC Radio with most of the original cast, adapted from the original TV scripts. Audio recordings of all three were included as bonus features on The Complete Series DVD collection.) Two further series 2 episodes were thought lost until 2001. Two of the three missing episodes have since been performed as part of the latest stage show.

In 2008, soundtracks of the missing episode "A Stripe for Frazer" and the 1968 Christmas Special "Present Arms" were recovered. The soundtrack of "A Stripe for Frazer" has been mixed with animation to replace the missing images. The Audio soundtrack for the 1970 Christmas Special "Cornish Floral Dance" has also been recovered.

Dad's Army: The Lost Episodes (2019)
In 2018, UKTV announced plans to recreate the three missing episodes for broadcast on its Gold channel. Mercury Productions, the company responsible for Saluting Dad's Army, Gold's 50th anniversary tribute series, produced the episodes, which were directed by Ben Kellett. The recreations were broadcast in August 2019, coinciding with the 50th anniversary of their original broadcast by the BBC. Kevin McNally and Robert Bathurst were the initial casting announcements as Captain Mainwaring and Sergeant Wilson, with Bernard Cribbins portraying Private Godfrey. The full cast was announced in January 2019, with McNally, Bathurst and Cribbins joined by Kevin Eldon, Mathew Horne, David Hayman and Tom Rosenthal. However, Bernard Cribbins subsequently withdrew from the project, and was replaced as Godfrey by Timothy West.

Cast

 Kevin McNally – Captain Mainwaring
 Robert Bathurst – Sergeant Wilson
 Kevin Eldon – Lance Corporal Jones
 David Hayman – Private Frazer
 Mathew Horne – Private Walker
 Timothy West – Private Godfrey
 Tom Rosenthal – Private Pike
 Tracy-Ann Oberman as Mrs Pike
 Simon Ludders as ARP Warden Hodges
 David Horovitch as Corporal-Colonel Square
 John Biggins as the Verger, who only appeared in one of the three episodes

Films

1971 film

In common with many British sitcoms of that era, Dad's Army was spun-off as a feature film which was released in 1971. Backers Columbia Pictures imposed arbitrary changes, such as recasting Liz Fraser as Mavis Pike and filming locations in Chalfont St Giles, Buckinghamshire, rather than Thetford in Norfolk, which made the cast unhappy. The director, Norman Cohen, whose idea it was to make the film, was nearly sacked by the studio.

Jimmy Perry and David Croft wrote the original screenplay. This was expanded by Cohen to try to make it more cinematic; Columbia executives made more changes to plot and pacing. As finally realised, two-thirds of the film consists of the creation of the platoon; this was the contribution of Perry and Croft, and differs in a number of ways from the formation of the platoon as seen in the first series of the television version. The final third shows the platoon in action, rescuing hostages from the church hall where they had been held captive by the crewmen of a downed German aircraft.

Neither the cast nor Perry and Croft were happy with the result. Perry argued for changes to try to reproduce the style of the television series, but with mixed results.

Filming took place from 10 August to 25 September 1970 at Shepperton Studios and on location. After shooting the film, the cast returned to working on the fourth television series.

The film's UK première was on 12 March 1971 at the Columbia Theatre, London. Critical reviews were mixed, but it performed well at the UK box-office. Discussions were held about a possible sequel, to be called Dad's Army and the Secret U-Boat Base, but the project never came to fruition.

2016 film

A second film, written by Hamish McColl and directed by Oliver Parker, was released in 2016. The cast included Toby Jones as Captain Mainwaring, Bill Nighy as Sergeant Wilson, Tom Courtenay as Lance Corporal Jones, Michael Gambon as Private Godfrey, Blake Harrison as Private Pike, Daniel Mays as Private Walker and Bill Paterson as Private Frazer. Catherine Zeta-Jones, Sarah Lancashire and Mark Gatiss also featured. The film was primarily shot on location in Yorkshire. Filming took place on the beach at North Landing, Flamborough Head, Yorkshire and at nearby Bridlington. It opened in February 2016 to mainly negative reviews.

Stage show

In 1975, Dad's Army transferred to the stage as a revue, with songs, familiar scenes from the show and individual "turns" for cast members. It was created by Roger Redfarn, who shared the same agent as the series' writers. Most of the principal cast transferred with it, with the exception of John Laurie, who was replaced by Hamish Roughead. Following James Beck's death two years earlier, Walker was played by John Bardon.

Dad's Army: A Nostalgic Music and Laughter Show of Britain's Finest Hour opened at Billingham in Teesside on 4 September 1975 for a two-week tryout. After cuts and revisions, the show transferred to London's West End and opened at the Shaftesbury Theatre on 2 October 1975. On the opening night there was a surprise appearance by Chesney Allen, singing the old Flanagan and Allen song Hometown with Arthur Lowe.

The show ran in the West End until 21 February 1976, disrupted twice by bomb scares and then toured the country until 4 September 1976. Clive Dunn was replaced for half the tour by Jack Haig (David Croft's original first choice for the role of Corporal Jones on television). Jeffrey Holland, who went on to star in several later Croft sitcoms, also had a number of roles in the production.

The stage show, billed as Dad's Army—The Musical, was staged in Australia and toured New Zealand in 2004–2005, starring Jon English. Several sections of this stage show were filmed and have subsequently been included as extras on the final Dad's Army DVD.

In April 2007, a new stage show was announced with cast members including Leslie Grantham as Private Walker and Emmerdale actor Peter Martin as Captain Mainwaring. The production contained the episodes "A Stripe for Frazer", "The Loneliness of the Long Distance Walker", "Room at the Bottom" and "The Deadly Attachment".

In August 2017, a new two-man stage show titled, Dad's Army Radio Hour, opened at the Edinburgh Festival Fringe It starred David Benson and Jack Lane. Between them, the pair voiced the entire cast of Dad's Army, including incidental characters. The episodes adapted from the original radio scripts were "The Deadly Attachment", "The Day the Balloon Went Up", "Brain Versus Brawn", "My British Buddy", "Round and Round Went the Great Big Wheel" and "Mum's Army". The production featured three episodes not adapted for the radio series "When You've Got to Go", "My Brother and I" and "Never Too Old". The show was well received by critics and the David Croft estate for its respectful and uncanny performances. In 2019, the production changed its name to Dad's Army Radio Show and continued to tour nationally throughout the UK until the end of 2021.

Radio series

The majority of the TV scripts were adapted for BBC Radio 4 with the original cast, although other actors played Walker after James Beck's death (which took place soon after recording and before transmission of the first radio series). Harold Snoad and Michael Knowles were responsible for the adaptation, while wartime BBC announcer John Snagge set the scene for each episode. Different actors were used for some of the minor parts: for example Mollie Sugden played the role of Mrs Fox, and Pearl Hackney played Mrs Pike. The first episode was based on the revised version of events seen in the opening of the film version, rather than on the TV pilot. The entire radio series has been released on CD.

Knowles and Snoad developed a radio series, It Sticks Out Half a Mile, which recounted what happened to some of the Dad's Army characters after the war. It was originally intended to star Arthur Lowe and John Le Mesurier, reprising their Dad's Army roles, but Lowe died after recording the pilot episode in 1981, so Bill Pertwee and Ian Lavender were brought in to replace him. Ironically, if Arthur Lowe had lived the series might never have been made, as the illness from which he suffered towards the end of his career badly affected his voice, which led to an initial decision not to commission it. In the event the revised cast recorded a 13-episode series. John Le Mesurier died in November 1983, making another series impossible.

The last radio recording of Dad's Army occurred in 1995, when Jimmy Perry wrote a radio sketch entitled The Boy Who Saved England for the "Full Steam A-Hudd" evening broadcast on Radio 2, transmitted on 3 June 1995 on the occasion of the closure of the BBC's Paris studios in Lower Regent Street. It featured Ian Lavender as Pike, Bill Pertwee as Hodges, Frank Williams as the Vicar and Jimmy Perry as General Haverlock-Seabag.

Other appearances
Lowe, Le Mesurier, Laurie, Beck, Ridley and Lavender (wearing Pike's signature scarf) appeared as guests in a 1971 edition of The Morecambe & Wise Show on BBC2 in the Monty on the Bonty sketch, with Lowe as Captain Bligh and the others as crewmen on HMS Bounty.

The cast appeared in a 1974 public information film, in character but set in the modern day, showing how to cross the road safely at Pelican crossings.

Lowe, Le Mesurier, Dunn, Lavender and Pertwee, and Jones's van, appeared in character at the finish of the 1974 London to Brighton Veteran Car Run.

Lowe, Le Mesurier and Laurie again made a cameo appearance as their Dad's Army characters in the 1977 Morecambe and Wise Christmas Special. As Elton John is following incomprehensible instructions to find the BBC studios, he encounters them in a steam room. On leaving, Mainwaring calls him a "stupid boy".

A pilot episode for an American remake called The Rear Guard was produced by ABC and broadcast on 10 August 1976, based on the episode "The Deadly Attachment". However, it failed to make it past the pilot stage.

Lowe and Le Mesurier made a final appearance in Dad's Army garb for a 1982 television commercial advertising Wispa chocolate bars.

Clive Dunn made occasional appearances as Lance Corporal Jones at 1940s themed events in the 1980s and 1990s and on television on the BBC Saturday night entertainment show Noel's House Party on 27 November 1993.

Arthur Lowe twice appeared on the BBC children's programme Blue Peter. The first time was with John Le Mesurier, in which the two appeared in costume and in character as Captain Mainwaring and Sergeant Wilson when walking around looking at and discussing a mural which schoolchildren had painted featuring the characters from the show at a Christmas party, among whom was Mainwaring's unseen wife Elizabeth – or rather, what the children thought she looked like (Mainwaring remarks "Good grief. What a remarkable likeness!"). Arthur Lowe made a second appearance as Captain Mainwaring on Blue Peter with the Dad's Army van which would appear in the forthcoming London-Brighton run and showed presenter John Noakes the vehicle's hidden anti-Nazi defences.

Awards
During its original television run, Dad's Army was nominated for multiple British Academy Television Awards, although only won "Best Light Entertainment Production Team" in 1971. It was nominated as "Best Situation Comedy" in 1973, 1974 and 1975. Also, Arthur Lowe was frequently nominated for "Best Light Entertainment Performance" in 1970, 1971, 1973, 1975 and 1978.

In 2000, the show was voted 13th in a British Film Institute poll of industry professionals of the 100 Greatest British Television Programmes. In 2004, championed by Phill Jupitus, it came fourth in the BBC poll to find Britain's Best Sitcom with 174,138 votes.

Tributes

In June 2010, a statue of Captain Mainwaring was erected in the Norfolk town of Thetford where most of the exteriors for the TV series were filmed. The statue features Captain Mainwaring sitting to attention on a simple bench in Home Guard uniform, with his swagger stick across his knees. The statue is mounted at the end of a winding brick pathway with a Union Flag patterned arrowhead to reflect the opening credits of the TV series and the sculpture has been designed so that members of the public can sit beside Captain Mainwaring and have their photograph taken. The statue was vandalised not long after the unveiling by a 10-year-old boy, who kicked it for 10 minutes and broke off the statue's glasses, throwing them into a nearby river. The statue has since been fixed.

The British sitcom Goodnight Sweetheart paid tribute to Dad's Army in episode one of its second series in 1995, "Don't Get Around Much Any More". Here, lead character Gary Sparrow (Nicholas Lyndhurst) – a time-traveller from the 1990s – goes into a bank in 1941 and meets a bank manager named Mainwaring and his chief clerk, Wilson, both of whom are in the Home Guard. When he hears the names Mainwaring and Wilson, Gary begins singing the Dad's Army theme song.

A brief visual tribute to Dad's Army is made at the start of the episode "Rag Week" from Ben Elton's 1990s sitcom The Thin Blue Line.

In June 2018 the Royal Mail issued a set of 8 stamps, featuring the main characters and their catchphrases, to mark the comedy's 50th anniversary.

In 2020, Niles Schilder for the Dad's Army Appreciation Society wrote four short scripts which followed how the characters from the series would have, in the author's opinion, dealt with the events of that year. Titles of the scripts included Dad’s Army Negotiates Brexit and An Unauthorised Gathering.

Cultural influence
The characters of Dad's Army and their catchphrases are well known in the UK due to the popularity of the series when originally shown and the frequency of repeats.

Jimmy Perry recalls that before writing the sitcom, the Home Guard was a largely forgotten aspect of Britain's defence in the Second World War, something which the series rectified. In a 1972 Radio Times interview, Arthur Lowe expressed surprise at the programme's success:

We expected the show to have limited appeal, to the age group that lived through the war and the Home Guard. We didn't expect what has happened – that children from the age of five upwards would enjoy it too.

By focusing on the comic aspects of the Home Guard in a cosy south coast setting, the TV series distorted the popular perception of the organisation. Its characters represented the older volunteers within the Home Guard but largely ignored the large numbers of teenagers and factory workers who also served. Accounts from Home Guard members and their regimental publications, inspired Norman Longmate's history The Real Dad's Army (1974).

Media releases

The BBC released two "Best of" DVD sets in October 2001 and September 2002, but it was not until September 2004 that the full series began to be released, with the first series and the surviving episodes of the second series being released first, along with the documentary Missing Presumed Wiped. By November 2007, the entire series had been released on DVD, with the final edition featuring the specials "My Brother and I" and "The Battle of the Giants" along with various other appearances, including several "Christmas Night with the Stars" sketches and excerpts from the 1976 stage show. The DVDs also include short individual biographical documentaries about the characters and their actors called We Are the Boys. The Columbia film adaptation is separately available; as this is not a BBC production, it is not included in the box set.

In 1973 the series was adapted into a comic strip, drawn by Bill Titcombe, which was published in daily newspapers in the UK. These cartoon strips were subsequently collected together and published in book form, by Piccolo Books, in paperback.

See also

 Dad's Army Appreciation Society
 Dad's Army Museum
 Bressingham Steam and Gardens
 Charles Burrell Museum
 Blitz and Pieces (another Dad's Army museum)
 Jones's van
 The Rear Guard (unsuccessful US adaptation)

References
Notes

Further reading
 Croft, David; Perry, Jimmy; Webber, Richard (2003). Dad's Army: The Complete Scripts. Orion.  
 Croft, David (2004). You Have Been Watching...: The Autobiography of David Croft. BBC Consumer Publishing (Books). 
 Croft, David; Perry, Jimmy; Webber, Richard (2000). The Complete A-Z of Dad's Army. Orion. 
 Longmate Norman (2010) The Real Dad's Army: The Story of the Home Guard. Amberley. 
 
 McKenzie, Simon (1995). The Home Guard: A military and political history. OUP. 
 Perry, Jimmy (2003). A Stupid Boy.  Arrow.

External links

Guides
 Dad's Army at the former BBC Guide to Comedy (archive)
 
 
 
 
 Dad's Army at the Encyclopedia of Television
 Dad's Army soundtrack CD at CD41

Miscellaneous
 Dad's Army Museum Thetford
 BBC Treasure Hunt site
 Guardian article—Jimmy Perry and David Croft talk about their writing relationship
 Dad's Army at the BBC Archive
 Dad's Army film locations in Norfolk
 Dad's Army TV and film locations in Norfolk
 Dad's Army podcast
 Bill Pertwee Interview – April 2010
 Filming locations from Dad's Army
 Croft & Perry Podcast

 
1968 British television series debuts
1977 British television series endings
1960s British sitcoms
1970s British sitcoms
BBC Radio comedy programmes
BBC television sitcoms
British military television series
David Croft sitcoms
English-language television shows
Television series about old age
Television shows adapted into comics
Television shows adapted into films
Television shows adapted into plays
Television shows adapted into radio programs
Television series created by Jimmy Perry
World War II television comedy series
BAFTA winners (television series)